Maximilian Schuster (born 29 July 1998) is a German footballer who plays as a midfielder for SV Schalding-Heining.

Club career
Schuster made his Austrian Football First League debut for FC Liefering on 3 March 2017 in a game against Floridsdorfer AC.

References

External links
 

1998 births
Living people
German footballers
Association football midfielders
2. Liga (Austria) players
Regionalliga players
FC Liefering players
SV Schalding-Heining players
German expatriate footballers
German expatriate sportspeople in Austria
Expatriate footballers in Austria